The Disorderly Houses Act 1751 (25 Geo 2 c 36) was an Act of the Parliament of Great Britain. It made provision in relation to disorderly houses. Most of it had been repealed by the mid-twentieth century, but one section, section 8, survived until 2008.

Section 8

Immediately before its repeal this section read:

The words omitted were repealed by section 15 of, and Part I of Schedule 6 to, the Betting and Gaming Act 1960.

Offences under this section were triable either way.

From 2003 until its repeal, this Act did not apply in relation to relevant premises within the meaning of section 159 of the Licensing Act 2003.

Repeal
Section 1 was repealed by the Statute Law Revision Act 1867.

Sections 2 to 4 were repealed by the section 93(1) of, and Part II of Schedule 18 to, the London Government Act 1963.

Sections 5 to 7 were repealed by section 34(1) of, and Schedule 2 to, the Administration of Justice Act 1965.

Section 8 was repealed by the Statute Law (Repeals) Act 2008.

Section 9 was repealed by the Statute Law Revision Act 1867.

Section 10 was repealed by section 56(4) of, and Part IV of Schedule 11 to, the Courts Act 1971.

Sections 11 and 12 were repealed by the Statute Law Revision Act 1867.

Sections 13 and 14 were repealed by the Statute Law Revision Act 1966.

Section 15 was repealed by the Statute Law Revision Act 1867.

See also
Halsbury's Statutes

References

External links
The Disorderly Houses Act 1751, as amended from the National Archives.

Great Britain Acts of Parliament 1751
Prostitution law in the United Kingdom